Gregory Stewart Burgess (born January 11, 1972) is an American former competition swimmer and Olympic medalist.

Burgess was born in Baltimore, Maryland.  He attended the Bolles School in Jacksonville, Florida, where he swam for the Bolles high school swim team.  He graduated from Bolles in 1990.

Burgess accepted an athletic scholarship to attend the University of Florida in Gainesville, Florida, where he swam for the Florida Gators swimming and diving team in National Collegiate Athletics Association (NCAA) competition from 1991 to 1994.  While in college, he set four American records: two in the 200-meter individual medley and two in the 400-meter individual medley, and was a four-time NCAA champion in the same two events in 1993 and 1994.  Burgess received twelve All-American honors as a Gator swimmer.  He graduated from the University of Florida with a bachelor's degree in economics in 1994.

He represented the United States in the 1992 and 1996 Olympic Games.  He won a silver medal for his second-place performance in the men's 200-meter individual medley at the 1992 Summer Olympics in Barcelona, Spain, finishing with a time of 2:00.97.  Four years later at the 1996 Summer Olympics in Atlanta, Georgia, he finished sixth in the event final of the men's 200-meter individual medley with a time of 2:02.56.

Burgess joined the U.S. Marine Corps in 1997, and has been promoted to the rank of major.  In 2010, Burgess was inducted into the Marine Corps Sports Hall of Fame.  Burgess has served two tours of duty in Iraq, and as the Chief of Mission for the U.S. military team at the international military games (CISM) for swimming in 2009 (Canada) and 2010 (Germany).  He is one of a select few American Olympians to volunteer for military service.

See also 

 List of Olympic medalists in swimming (men)
 List of United States records in swimming
 List of University of Florida alumni
 List of University of Florida Olympians
 List of World Aquatics Championships medalists in swimming (men)

References 

Sources
 

1972 births
Living people
American male freestyle swimmers
American male medley swimmers
Florida Gators men's swimmers
Olympic silver medalists for the United States in swimming
Pan American Games gold medalists for the United States
Sportspeople from Baltimore
Swimmers at the 1992 Summer Olympics
Swimmers at the 1995 Pan American Games
Swimmers at the 1996 Summer Olympics
United States Marine Corps officers
World Aquatics Championships medalists in swimming
Medalists at the 1992 Summer Olympics
Pan American Games silver medalists for the United States
Bolles School alumni
Pan American Games medalists in swimming
Universiade medalists in swimming
Universiade gold medalists for the United States
Universiade silver medalists for the United States
Medalists at the 1991 Summer Universiade
Medalists at the 1995 Pan American Games